Colias hecla, the northern clouded yellow or hecla sulphur, is a butterfly in the family Pieridae. In Europe, it is found in the northern part of  Norway, Sweden and Finland up to heights of 900 m. It is also found in Greenland, Alaska, the Northwest Territories, Yukon, Quebec, Labrador, Manitoba, the Chukot region, eastern Chukotka, and the Russian Far East.

The wingspan is 36–46 mm. The butterfly flies in June to August depending on the location. It is found in moist tundras.

The larvae feed on Astragalus species, including Astragalus frigidus and Astragalus alpinus as well as Trifolium repens. They are also known to feed on Salix arctica where Astragalus are absent.

Subspecies

C. h. hecla (Greenland)
C. h. glacialis (Alaska and the Northwest Territories, Yukon, Quebec, Labrador)
C. h. hela (Manitoba, Northwest Territories)
C. h. aquilonaris or C. h. orientis (Chukot region, Far East)
C. h. sulitelma (Scandinavia, northwestern Siberia)
C. h. zamolodchikovi (East Chukotka)
C. h. viluiensis Ménétries, 1859 (Transbaikal)

C. h. sulitelma is sometimes treated as a separate species Colias sulitelma. If that is the case, C. h. zamolodchikovi is considered a subspecies of Colias sulitelma, named Colias sulitelma zamolodchikovi.

Furthermore, Colias canadensis is sometimes treated as a subspecies of Colias hecla, named C. h. canadensis.

References

External links

Colias hecla von J. Fuchs
Colias hecla, Lepidoptera of Norway
Colias hecla, Russian Insects
State Darwin Museum Darwin Museum type specimen images of subspecies zamolodchikovi.

hecla
Butterflies of Europe
Insects of the Arctic
Butterflies described in 1836
Butterflies of North America